Dopp Hill is a summit located in Central New York Region of New York located in the Town of Western in Oneida County, south of Westernville.

References

Mountains of Oneida County, New York
Mountains of New York (state)